is a 2006 Japanese magical girl anime series directed by Megumu Ishiguro, based on the American animated television series The Powerpuff Girls. The anime was co-produced by Cartoon Network Japan and Aniplex and was animated by Toei Animation.

The series featured character designs by Miho Shimogasa, who was the character designer of Cutie Honey Flash and Ultra Maniac and one of the animation directors of Sailor Moon. As production occurred in Japan, the creator of  The Powerpuff Girls, Craig McCracken was not involved with the project. Powerpuff Girls Z was aired in Japan on TV Tokyo between July 2006 and June 2007. In addition to Cartoon Network Japan, the anime was also broadcast on AT-X. A manga adaptation by Shiho Komiyuno ran in Shueisha's Ribon magazine between July 2006 and June 2007.

The anime's English-language adaptation was produced in association with Ocean Productions in Canada. It was aired on Cartoon Network in the Philippines and Boomerang in Australia and New Zealand in 2008.

Plot summary 

Professor Utonium, his son, Ken Kitazawa, and his toy dog, Peach, are busy working on Chemical X, a powerful chemical substance in Tokyo City (New Townsville in the English dub), when Peach accidentally drops a daifuku into a vat of Chemical X, which magically transforms it into Chemical Z. Countries around the world suddenly experience weather calamity, and Ken uses a light beam ray attached to the vat of Chemical Z to blast Chemical Z on an iceberg in the Tokyo City bay, causing black-and-white rays of light to appear in the skies above it.

Three ordinary 13-year-old girls, Momoko Akatsutsumi, Miyako Gōtokuji, and Kaoru Matsubara, are engulfed in white light, which transforms them into Hyper Blossom, Rolling Bubbles, and Powered Buttercup, the Powerpuff Girls Z. Peach is also engulfed in white light, transforming into a toy dog who can talk and call the girls to transform. Numerous rays of black light engulf people, animals, and objects to transform them into evil monsters who want to take over Tokyo City, such as Mojo Jojo, Fuzzy Lumpkins, Princess Himeko, Sedusa, the Gangreen Gang and the Amoeba Boys. The Powerpuff Girls Z must protect Tokyo City with the help from the Professor, Ken, Mayor Mayer and his assistant, Ms. Bellum, and use their respective weapons, including Blossom's yo-yo, Bubbles' bubble rod and Buttercup's hammer from evil monsters.

Episodes

Media

Music 

The anime uses six pieces of theme music, two opening themes and four ending themes. In the English dub, an original song is used for the opening theme whilst the end credits used shortened versions of the six Japanese opening and ending themes. The official soundtrack was released in Japan by Aniplex on June 27, 2007. The soundtrack consists of TV size versions of most of the series theme songs, the series score by composers Taichi Master and Hiroshi Nakamura presented in the form of a party mix and character songs performed by Japanese voice actresses Emiri Katō, Nami Miyahara and Machiko Kawana who voiced the Powerpuff Girls Z. The album has a booklet that features concept art for all the characters.

 Opening themes
  by Nana Kitade (eps 1-26)
  by Hoi Festa (eps 27-52)

 Ending themes
  by Liu Yi Fei (eps 1-13)
 "LOOK" by HALCALI (eps 14-26)
  by Wiz-US (eps 27-39)
  by Hearts Grow (eps 40-52)

Manga 
A manga adaptation was illustrated by Shiho Komiyuno, was published in Shueisha's Ribon magazine between July 2006 and June 2007 and it features original characters in the manga like a pair of androids called Alpha and Beta who are the main antagonists of the manga and a boy named Natsuki Urawa who Momoko has a heavy crush at her middle high school.

Video game 

 was developed by Infinity and published by Bandai for the Nintendo DS on June 12, 2007. The game has board-game style gameplay similar to Mario Party and features Hyper Blossom, Rolling Bubbles and Powered Buttercup competing with Mojo Jojo to get to the center of the board, competing in minigames along the way.

See also 

 The Powerpuff Girls

References

External links 
 
 Demashita! Powerpuff Girls Z at TV Tokyo
 Demashita! Powerpuff Girls Z at Toei Animation
 Demashita! Powerpuff Girls Z at Aniplex
Demashita! Powerpuff Girls Z at Sony Music Japan
 Game de Demashita! Powerpuff Girls Z at Bandai
 

The Powerpuff Girls mass media
2007 Japanese television series endings
2007 comics endings
Japanese children's animated action television series
Japanese children's animated adventure television series
Japanese children's animated comic science fiction television series
Japanese children's animated science fantasy television series
Aniplex
Magical girl anime and manga
Shōjo manga
Toei Animation television
TV Tokyo original programming
Japanese television series based on American television series